The 1961 Pan Arab Games football tournament was the 3rd edition of the Pan Arab Games men's football tournament. The football tournament was held in Casablanca, Morocco between 3–10 September 1961 as part of the 1961 Pan Arab Games.

Participating teams
The following countries have participated for the final tournament:

Squads

Final tournament

External links
3rd Pan Arab Games, 1961 (Casablanca, Morocco) - rsssf.com

1961 Pan Arab Games
1961
Pan
Pan
1961